Amina Rouba (born 9 January 1986) is an Algerian rower. She competed in the single sculls race at the 2012 Summer Olympics and placed 2nd in Final E and 26th overall. She also competed in the Rowing at the 2016 Summer Olympics – Women's single sculls and placed 3rd in Final D and 21st overall.

References

External links 
 
  (2012 Summer Olympics)
  (2016 Summer Olympics)

1986 births
Living people
Algerian female rowers
Olympic rowers of Algeria
Rowers at the 2012 Summer Olympics
Rowers at the 2016 Summer Olympics
African Games silver medalists for Algeria
African Games medalists in rowing
Competitors at the 2013 Mediterranean Games
Competitors at the 2018 Mediterranean Games
Competitors at the 2007 All-Africa Games
Competitors at the 2019 African Games
African Games gold medalists for Algeria
Mediterranean Games competitors for Algeria
21st-century Algerian women
20th-century Algerian women